Bradford County is a county in the U.S. state of Florida. As of the 2020 census, the population was 28,303. Its county seat and largest city is Starke.

History
New River County, as it was known at the time, was created in 1858 from segments of Columbia and Alachua counties. It was renamed Bradford County in 1861 in honor of Confederate Captain Richard Bradford, who fought in the American Civil War and was killed in the Battle of Santa Rosa Island, becoming the first officer from Florida to die during the Civil War.

During the county's early history, Lake Butler served as the county seat. However, the growth of Starke as an important city on the Fernandina to Cedar Key railroad led to an 1875 vote on the location of the county seat, with Starke winning by 46 votes. A successful legal challenge brought the county seat back to Lake Butler, and an 1885 referendum reaffirmed the move by 19 votes.

Yet another referendum was held in 1887, and saw the courthouse and county seat moved back to Starke, where it would remain. The dispute brought on the attention of the Florida Legislature, and in 1921, the western portion of Bradford County and Lake Butler were separated to form Union County.

The county was home to numerous citrus farms in its early days prior to the Great Freeze in the winter of 1894-1895. Even after the freeze, Starke and Lawtey continued to be major regional agricultural producers, with the primary exports being cotton, tobacco, and strawberries.

Significant growth would come to the county during the World War II era, with the construction of U.S. Route 301 and nearby Camp Blanding.

Post-war, the county saw the construction of Florida State Prison on the Bradford-Union County line in Raiford, along with several moments in the national media spotlight. Ted Bundy was executed at the prison in 1989, while Starke and Bradford County faced a series lawsuits in the 2000s over a cross on the city's water tower and a Ten Commandments statue in front of the county courthouse.

Geography
It is the third-smallest county in Florida by land area and second-smallest by total area.

Adjacent counties
 Baker County, Florida - north
 Clay County, Florida - east
 Putnam County, Florida - southeast
 Alachua County, Florida - south
 Union County, Florida - west
 Duval County, Florida - northeast

National protected area
 Osceola National Forest (part)

Demographics

As of the 2020 United States census, there were 28,303 people, 9,318 households, and 5,882 families residing in the county.

At the 2000 census there were 26,088 people, 8,497 households, and 6,194 families in the county. The population density was 89 people per square mile (34/km2). There were 9,605 housing units at an average density of 33 per square mile (13/km2).  The racial makeup of the county was 76.28% White, 20.79% Black or African American, 0.34% Native American, 0.61% Asian, 0.10% Pacific Islander, 0.65% from other races, and 1.24% from two or more races. 2.38% of the population were Hispanic or Latino of any race.
Of the 8,497 households 31.90% had children under the age of 18 living with them, 55.40% were married couples living together, 13.30% had a female householder with no husband present, and 27.10% were non-families. 22.90% of households were one person and 9.70% were one person aged 65 or older. The average household size was 2.58 and the average family size was 3.01.

The age distribution was 21.90% under the age of 18, 9.50% from 18 to 24, 32.10% from 25 to 44, 23.50% from 45 to 64, and 12.90% 65 or older. The median age was 37 years. For every 100 females there were 127.00 males. For every 100 females age 18 and over, there were 132.50 males.

The median household income was $33,140 and the median family income  was $39,123. Males had a median income of $29,494 versus $20,745 for females. The per capita income for the county was $14,226. About 11.10% of families and 14.60% of the population were below the poverty line, including 18.30% of those under age 18 and 17.60% of those age 65 or over.

Government and infrastructure
The Florida Department of Corrections operates several correctional facilities in unincorporated areas. The facilities include Florida State Prison, Florida State Prison – West Unit, and New River Correctional Institution. Florida State Prison houses one of Florida's two male death rows and the State of Florida execution chamber.

Politics

Voter registration
According to the Secretary of State's office, Republicans account for a majority of registered voters in Bradford County.

State and Local elections
For most of its history, Bradford County voted heavily Democratic at the local, state, and federal level. The county flipped at the Presidential level for the last time in 1984, and has voted heavily Republican in presidential and congressional races since. In 2015, Republicans overtook Democrats for the first time in registration advantage, and by 2018, nearly all county offices had flipped to the Republican Party.

Education
Bradford County School District operates public schools. Bradford High School is the county's public high school.

The main library serving Bradford County is the Bradford County Public Library in Starke.  the library director is Robert E. Perone.

Communities

Cities
 Hampton
 Lawtey
 Starke

Town
 Brooker

See also

 National Register of Historic Places listings in Bradford County, Florida

Notes

References

External links

 County website
 Bradford County Telegraph
 Bradford County Schools
 Bradford County Supervisor of Elections

 
1858 establishments in Florida
Florida counties
North Florida
Populated places established in 1858